Speakin' My Piece is an album by American jazz pianist Horace Parlan and his quintet, recorded and released on the Blue Note label in 1960.

Reception
The Allmusic review by Stephen Thomas Erlewine awarded the album 4 stars and stated: "Speakin' My Piece is one of the first albums to find Parlan getting all the ingredients right, from his own subtle playing to soliciting fine contributions of his backing band... a charmingly low-key session".

Track listing
All compositions by Horace Parlan except as indicated

 "Wadin'" - 6:08
 "Up in Cynthia's Room" - 6:20
 "Borderline" (Stanley Turrentine) - 6:13
 "Rastus" (Tommy Turrentine) - 6:54
 "Oh So Blue" (Leon Mitchell) - 7:41
 "Speakin' My Piece" - 6:11
 "Rastus" [alternate take] (Tommy Turrentine)  6:49 Bonus track on CD reissue
 "Oh So Blue" [alternate take] (Mitchell) - 7:41 Bonus track on CD reissue

Personnel
Horace Parlan - piano
Tommy Turrentine - trumpet
Stanley Turrentine - tenor saxophone
George Tucker - bass
Al Harewood - drums

References

Blue Note Records albums
Horace Parlan albums
1960 albums
Albums produced by Alfred Lion
Albums recorded at Van Gelder Studio